Walter Stillman Martin (1862 – 1935), was an American Baptist minister who studied ministry at Harvard University. But he later switched to the denomination of Disciples of Christ. He was married to Civilla Durfee Martin (August 21, 1866 – March 9, 1948), a Canadian-American writer of many religious hymns and gospel songs. In the late 19th century and early 20th century, Martin and his wife together created hymns and songs which have become widely known.  Some of her most popular pieces include "God Will Take Care of You", "One of God's Days", "Going Home", "The Old Fashioned Way", and "His Eye Is on the Sparrow".

External links

 Therestorationmovement.com
 Biography at the Cyber Hymnal

1862 births
1935 deaths
19th-century Baptist ministers from the United States
American Disciples of Christ
American Christian hymnwriters
American male songwriters